The Kirchhoff–Love theory of plates is a two-dimensional mathematical model that is used to determine the stresses and deformations in thin plates subjected to forces and moments. This theory is an extension of Euler-Bernoulli beam theory and was developed in 1888 by Love using assumptions proposed by Kirchhoff. The theory assumes that a mid-surface plane can be used to represent a three-dimensional plate in two-dimensional form.

The following kinematic assumptions that are made in this theory:
 straight lines normal to the mid-surface remain straight after deformation
 straight lines normal to the mid-surface remain normal to the mid-surface after deformation
 the thickness of the plate does not change during a deformation.

Assumed displacement field 
Let the position vector of a point in the undeformed plate be .  Then
  

Let the displacement of a point in the plate be .  Then

This displacement can be decomposed into a vector sum of the mid-surface displacement  and an out-of-plane displacement  in the  direction.  We can write the in-plane displacement of the mid-surface as
 
Note that the index  takes the values 1 and 2 but not 3.

Then the Kirchhoff hypothesis implies that

If  are the angles of rotation of the normal to the mid-surface, then in the Kirchhoff-Love theory

Quasistatic Kirchhoff-Love plates 
The original theory developed by Love was valid for infinitesimal strains and rotations.  The theory was extended by von Kármán to situations where moderate rotations could be expected.

Strain-displacement relations
For the situation where the strains in the plate are infinitesimal and the rotations of the mid-surface normals are less than 10° the strain-displacement relations are

Using the kinematic assumptions we have

Therefore, the only non-zero strains are in the in-plane directions.

Equilibrium equations
The equilibrium equations for the plate can be derived from the principle of virtual work. For a thin plate under a quasistatic transverse load  pointing towards positive  direction, these equations are

In index notation, 

where  are the stresses.

{| class="toccolours collapsible collapsed" width="60%" style="text-align:left"
!Derivation of equilibrium equations for small rotations
|-
|For the situation where the strains and rotations of the plate are small the virtual internal energy is given by

Integration by parts leads to

The symmetry of the stress tensor implies that .  Hence,

Another integration by parts gives

For the case where there are no prescribed external forces, the principle of virtual work implies that .  The equilibrium equations for the plate are then given by

If the plate is loaded by an external distributed load  that is normal to the mid-surface and directed in the positive  direction, the external virtual work due to the load is

The principle of virtual work  then leads to the equilibrium equations

|}

Boundary conditions
The boundary conditions that are needed to solve the equilibrium equations of plate theory can be obtained from the boundary terms in the principle of virtual work.  In the absence of external forces on the boundary, the boundary conditions are

Note that the quantity  is an effective shear force.

Constitutive relations
The stress-strain relations for a linear elastic Kirchhoff plate are given by

Since  and  do not appear in the equilibrium equations it is implicitly assumed that these quantities do not have any effect on the momentum balance and are neglected.  The remaining stress-strain relations, in matrix form, can be written as

Then,

and

The  extensional stiffnesses are the quantities

The  bending stiffnesses (also called flexural rigidity) are the quantities

The Kirchhoff-Love constitutive assumptions lead to zero shear forces.  As a result, the equilibrium equations for the plate have to be used to determine the shear forces in thin Kirchhoff-Love plates.  For isotropic plates, these equations lead to

Alternatively, these shear forces can be expressed as

where

Small strains and moderate rotations 
If the rotations of the normals to the mid-surface are in the range of 10 to 15, the strain-displacement relations can be approximated as

Then the kinematic assumptions of Kirchhoff-Love theory lead to the classical plate theory with von Kármán strains

This theory is nonlinear because of the quadratic terms in the strain-displacement relations.

If the strain-displacement relations take the von Karman form, the equilibrium equations can be expressed as

Isotropic quasistatic Kirchhoff-Love plates 
For an isotropic and  homogeneous plate, the stress-strain relations are

The moments corresponding to these stresses are

In expanded form,

where  for plates of thickness .  Using the stress-strain relations for the plates, we can show that the stresses and moments are related by 
 
At the top of the plate where , the stresses are

Pure bending 
For an isotropic and homogeneous plate under pure bending, the governing equations reduce to

In index notation,

and in direct notation

which is known as the biharmonic equation.
The bending moments are given by

{| class="toccolours collapsible collapsed" width="60%" style="text-align:left"
!Derivation of equilibrium equations for pure bending
|-
|For an isotropic, homogeneous plate under pure bending the governing equations are

and the stress-strain relations are

Then,

and 

Differentiation gives

and

Plugging into the governing equations leads to

Hence

In direct tensor notation, the governing equation of the plate is

where we have assumed that the displacements  are constant.
|}

Bending under transverse load 
Following the procedure shown in the previous section we get

In rectangular Cartesian coordinates, the governing equation is

and in cylindrical coordinates it takes the form 

Solutions of this equation for various geometries and boundary conditions can be found in the article on bending of plates.
{| class="toccolours collapsible collapsed" width="60%" style="text-align:left"
!Derivation of equilibrium equations for transverse loading
|-
|For a transversely loaded plate without axial deformations, the governing equation has the form

where  is a distributed transverse load (per unit area).  Substitution of the expressions for the derivatives of  into the governing equation gives

Noting that the bending stiffness is the quantity

we can write the governing equation in the form

In cylindrical coordinates ,

For symmetrically loaded circular plates, and we have

|}

Cylindrical bending 
Under certain loading conditions a flat plate can be bent into the shape of the surface of a cylinder.  This type of bending is called cylindrical bending and represents the special situation where .  In that case

and

and the governing equations become

Dynamics of Kirchhoff-Love plates 
The dynamic theory of thin plates determines the propagation of waves in the plates, and the study of standing waves and vibration modes.

Governing equations 
The governing equations for the dynamics of a Kirchhoff-Love plate are

where, for a plate with density , 

and 

{| class="toccolours collapsible collapsed" width="60%" style="text-align:left"
!Derivation of equations governing the dynamics of Kirchhoff-Love plates
|-
|
The total kinetic energy (more precisely, action of kinetic energy) of the plate is given by

Therefore, the variation in kinetic energy is

We use the following notation in the rest of this section.

Then

For a Kirchhof-Love plate

Hence,

Define, for constant  through the thickness of the plate, 

Then

Integrating by parts,

Hence, after switching the sequence of integration, we have

Integration by parts over the mid-surface gives

Again, since the variations are zero at the beginning and the end of the time interval under consideration, we have

For the dynamic case, the variation in the internal energy is given by

Integration by parts and invoking zero variation at the boundary of the mid-surface gives

If there is an external distributed force  acting normal to the surface of the plate, the virtual external work done is

From the principle of virtual work, or more precisely, Hamilton's principle for a deformable body, we have .  Hence the governing balance equations for the plate are

|}

Solutions of these equations for some special cases can be found in the article on vibrations of plates.  The figures below show some vibrational modes of a circular plate.

Isotropic plates 
The governing equations simplify considerably for isotropic and homogeneous plates for which the in-plane deformations can be neglected.  In that case we are left with one equation of the following form (in rectangular Cartesian coordinates):

where  is the bending stiffness of the plate.  For a uniform plate of thickness ,

In direct notation

For free vibrations, the governing equation becomes

{| class="toccolours collapsible collapsed" width="60%" style="text-align:left"
!Derivation of dynamic governing equations for isotropic Kirchhoff-Love plates
|-
|
For an isotropic and  homogeneous plate, the stress-strain relations are

where  are the in-plane strains.  The strain-displacement relations
for Kirchhoff-Love plates are

Therefore, the resultant moments corresponding to these stresses are

The governing equation for an isotropic and homogeneous plate of uniform thickness  in the 
absence of in-plane displacements is

Differentiation of the expressions for the moment resultants gives us

Plugging into the governing equations leads to

Since the order of differentiation is irrelevant we have .  Hence

If the flexural stiffness of the plate is defined as

we have

For small deformations, we often neglect the spatial derivatives of the transverse acceleration of the
plate and we are left with

Then, in direct tensor notation, the governing equation of the plate is

|}

References

See also 
Bending
Bending of plates
Infinitesimal strain theory
Linear elasticity
Plate theory
Stress (mechanics)
Stress resultants
Vibration of plates

Continuum mechanics
Gustav Kirchhoff